Convicted Women Against Abuse (CWAA) is an inmate-initiated and inmate-led group in the United States prison system and is located at the California Institution for Women (CIW) in Chino, CA. This group provides a setting for incarcerated women to share their past experiences of victimization and to discuss their legal cases.

External links 
 Official Sin by Silence website

Domestic violence-related organizations in the United States
Organizations based in California